Küçüksütlüce is a village in the Ardahan District, Ardahan Province, Turkey. Its population is 330 (2021).

References

Villages in Ardahan District